A cam is a mechanical linkage which translates motion.

Cam or CAM may also refer to:

Businesses and organizations 
 Caja de Ahorros del Mediterráneo, a Spanish savings bank
 Cam FM, University of Cambridge radio station
 CAM (record company), aka CAM Jazz
 CAM Community School District, a school district in Iowa
Compagnie des Autobus de Monaco, Monegasque transport company
 Coordinadora Arauco-Malleco, an indigenous Mapuche organization in Chile
 Compagnie Aerienne du Mali, now Air Mali
 Comité d'Action Musulman, a former political party in Mauritius

People 
 Cam (name), a list of people with either the given name or surname
 Cam'ron (born 1976), American rapper, formerly known as Killa Cam
 Cam (singer) (born 1984), American country singer Camaron Marvel Ochs
 Charles Augustus Magnussen, fictional character from  Sherlock, owning CAM News
 Cameron "Cam" Watanabe, a character in Power Rangers: Ninja Storm known as the Green Samurai Ranger
 Cameron "Cam" Tucker, a character from comedy series Modern Family

Places 
 Çam, Akyurt, Ankara Province, Turkey, a neighborhood of the District of Akyurt
 Cam, Gloucestershire, a village and civil parish in England
 Cam Loch, Scotland
 Cam Mountains, An Giang Province, Vietnam
 Cam River (disambiguation)
 Cam Brook a small river in Somerset, England

In science and technology
 Camera or webcam
 Camshaft, a shaft with a cam

In computing 
 CAM Table, to find where to forward a data packet
 Categorical abstract machine in applicative computing
 Computer-aided manufacturing
 Computer-aided mural, by digital printing
 Conditional-access module, to access scrambled TV programs
 Content-addressable memory
 Content Assembly Mechanism, for information exchange

In biology 
 Calmodulin (CaM), a calcium-binding protein
 Cell adhesion molecule, proteins on cell surfaces
 Chorioallantoic membrane, in developing eggs
 Crassulacean acid metabolism, a plant carbon-fixing pathway

Other uses 
 Camelopardalis, a constellation, abbreviated Cam
 Centrifuge Accommodations Module of the International Space Station (canceled)
Cockpit Area Microphone, part of an aircraft's Cockpit Voice Recorder

Museums 
 Cartoon Art Museum, an art museum in San Francisco, California, US
 Castle Air Museum, an air museum in Atwater, California, US
 Chinese American Museum, an ethnic museum in Los Angeles, US
 Cincinnati Art Museum, an art museum in Cincinnati, Ohio, US
 Chinese Association of Museums, Taiwan

In sport and recreation 
 CAM the Ram, mascot of the athletic teams of Colorado State University
 CAM Timișoara, a former football club (1911–1949) based in Timişoara, Romania
 Clube Atlético Mineiro, a popular Brazilian football team
 Cam ECS-12, a 2014 Nerf Blaster released under the N-Strike Elite series
In climbing, a spring-loaded camming device
Central attacking midfielder, a position in association football

Military 
 CAM ship (Catapult Aircraft Merchantman), World War II
 Corpo d'Armata Motocorazzato, an Italian Army corps, World War II

Codes 
 Camberley railway station, England, station code
 Camberwell railway station, Melbourne, Australia, station code
 Cambodia, IOC country code
 Cambridgeshire, England, Chapman code
 Camden Seaboard Air Line Railway Depot, South Carolina, US, Amtrak station code
 Camai Air a US airline, ICAO designator (see Airline codes-C)

Other uses 
 Cam (bootleg), motion picture recording
 Cam (film), a 2018 American horror-thriller film
 Churchie Awards in Media, art awards at the Anglican Church Grammar School in Brisbane, Australia
 Common area maintenance charges, a leasing term
 Complementary and alternative medicine
 Tropical Storm Cam (1996)
 Tropical Storm Cam (1999)

See also 
 Camming (disambiguation)
 Kam (disambiguation)
 Çam (disambiguation)